Malvern is a borough in Chester County, Pennsylvania, United States. The population was 3,419 at the 2020 census.

History

The area was originally settled by Welsh immigrants in the 17th century who bought land from William Penn. Malvern is the site of the Paoli Massacre, which occurred September 20, 1777, during the American Revolutionary War under the command of General Anthony Wayne of nearby Easttown. In 1835, the East Whiteland Baptist Church moved to what is now its church and cemetery property, bounded by Channing, South Warren, and East First Avenues, and Roberts Lane. Changing its name to the Willistown Baptist Church, this institution then became the First Baptist Church of Malvern in 1900.

The church, trains, and a few businesses were the nucleus of this village, which was known for a long period as West Chester Intersection due to its position at the junction of the Philadelphia and Columbia Railroad and the West Chester Railroad. In 1873, the community’s name was changed to Malvern when the Philadelphia and Columbia's successor, the Pennsylvania Railroad, straightened its tracks through the village. In 1879, the Malvern Friends Meeting was built at the northwest corner of Woodland Avenue and Roberts Lane, followed by the arrival of the Presbyterians and the Methodists prior to 1900. The village's status as a railroad junction came to an end in March 1880 when the West Chester Railroad's northern terminal was moved west to Frazer, Pennsylvania. Malvern Borough has a mix of residential styles and neighborhoods, retail and industrial businesses, dedicated open land, and numerous civic, cultural, and religious organizations.

Malvern was incorporated August 13, 1889, having separated from the northern portion of Willistown Township. On April 22, 2008, the Borough converted to a Home Rule form of government.

The Paoli Massacre monument, battlefield and parade grounds are located within the borough. Other sites of interest in neighboring townships include the Wharton Esherick Studio, listed on the National Register of Historic Places in 1973. It was designated a National Historic Landmark in 1993.

Geography

The borough is bordered by Paoli Pike on the south, Sugartown Road on the west, Willistown Township on the east, and East Whiteland Township on the north.

The Malvern ZIP code covers Malvern and all or parts of East Whiteland, Charlestown, Willistown, East Goshen, East Pikeland, and Tredyffrin Townships. Malvern Borough is between Paoli on the east, and Immaculata University and Exton on the west.

Demographics

At the time of the 2010 census, the borough was 87.8% non-Hispanic White, 2.9% Black or African American, 0.3% Native American, 4.2% Asian, and 1.9% were two or more races. 3.7% of the population were of Hispanic or Latino ancestry.

As of the census of 2000, there were 3,059 people, 1,361 households, and 793 families residing in the borough. The population density was 2,444.6 people per square mile (944.9/km²). There were 1,419 housing units at an average density of 1,134.0 per square mile (438.3/km²). The racial makeup of the borough was 91.11% White, 3.82% African American, 0.20% Native American, 3.24% Asian, 0.26% from other races, and 1.37% from two or more races. Hispanic or Latino of any race were 1.54% of the population.

There were 1,361 households, out of which 23.4% had children under the age of 18 living with them, 46.7% were married couples living together, 8.4% had a female householder with no husband present, and 41.7% were non-families. 34.2% of all households were made up of individuals, and 9.4% had someone living alone who was 65 years of age or older. The average household size was 2.23 and the average family size was 2.92.

In the borough the population was spread out, with 20.1% under the age of 18, 5.2% from 18 to 24, 37.0% from 25 to 44, 22.8% from 45 to 64, and 14.9% who were 65 years of age or older. The median age was 38 years. For every 100 females there were 93.0 males. For every 100 females age 18 and over, there were 87.4 males.

The median income for a household in the borough was $62,308, and the median income for a family was $79,145. Males had a median income of $45,281 versus $39,129 for females. The per capita income for the borough was $35,477. About 0.9% of families and 2.7% of the population were below the poverty line, including 3.8% of those under age 18 and 3.2% of those age 65 or over.

Economy

The Malvern Business and Professional Association promotes Malvern commerce and the borough's unique character. Siemens Healthcare, Ricoh Americas Corporation (formerly IKON Office Solutions), The Vanguard Group, Liberty Property Trust, The Center for Professional Innovation & Education Corporation, Cerner, Vishay Intertechnology, CertainTeed, Endo International and AmericanMuscle are among the companies based in Malvern.

Fisher Feed and Amerigas were two former employers located on East King Street in the Planning Area #10 of the Malvern Borough Comprehensive Plan. This plan amends a zoning ordinance to provide for redeveloping the land once used by the two former employers. The Malvern Patch, a local newspaper, stated that Kimberton Whole Foods will be opening its fifth location in the East King Street area. The projected occupancy date for the East King Street area is late summer 2013 according to the developer. This development is unrelated to the mixed-use development in an area called "Uptown Worthington" which is actually part of East Whiteland.

Arts and culture

Points of interest

Within the borough
 Battle of Paoli, fought in Malvern, and is on the National Register of Historic Places
 Samuel & M. Elizabeth Burke Park, Theodore S.A. Rubino Memorial Park, The Horace J. Quann Memorial Park, and John and Marion Herzak Park.
 Annual Memorial Day Parade, first held in 1869, tying Malvern's Parade with few others for the oldest Memorial Day parade
 Victorian Christmas, the first Friday evening and Saturday of December

In the Malvern ZIP Code
 Duffy's Cut, a stretch of railroad line just outside Malvern Borough
 Immaculata University, in East Whiteland Township
 Great Valley Corporate Center, business park
 Jim Croce is buried in Haym Salomon Cemetery
 Swiss Pines, an arboretum and Japanese garden
 Battle of Paoli, a Revolutionary War battlefield
 PrimeRide Services, a Corporate Transportation, Airport Transportation Service.

Education
The Great Valley School District serves as the public education for the borough.

The Borough contains two private schools. Malvern Preparatory School, an independent Catholic School for boys grades 6–12. It was founded by the Order of St. Augustine at Vilanova University in 1842 and moved to its present location in 1920. The Willistown Country Day School (Montessori) is for K–6th grade. The Borough is also home to a Catholic elementary school for grades K–8, colloquially called St. Patrick's. The St. Patrick School spent the early part of 2012 embattled with the Roman Catholic Archdiocese of Philadelphia over a proposed merger with the St. Monica School of nearby Berwyn, winning their case in March of that year.

Villa Maria Academy (Malvern, Pennsylvania) is a private, all girls Catholic college preparatory high school (grades 9 to 12) accredited by the Commonwealth of Pennsylvania and Middle States Association of Colleges and Secondary Schools. Villa Maria Academy is located less than a mile to the east of the border of Malvern Borough, in Willistown Township.

Two institutions for higher education include Penn State Great Valley School of Graduate Professional Studies and Immaculata University, both within the Malvern ZIP code.

Media 
The Borough of Malvern is served by two newspapers:  the Philadelphia Inquirer and Daily Local News.  The Inquirer is a paper of record for the greater Philadelphia region, as such its time is spent covering the events of the city and the greater Delaware Valley.

Infrastructure

Roads

No numbered highways serve Malvern directly. Main thoroughfares through the borough include King Street, which follows a southwest-to-northeast alignment, and Warren Street, which follows a northwest-to-southeast alignment. The two streets meet near the center of town. Nearby highways include U.S. Route 202 and U.S. Route 30, which connect to King of Prussia to the north, Philadelphia to the east, West Chester to the south and Lancaster to the west. Pennsylvania Route 29 also passes nearby and connects the area to the Pennsylvania Turnpike to the north.

Transit
Malvern is served by train via the Malvern station connecting it to Center City Philadelphia via SEPTA Regional Rail's Paoli/Thorndale Line. OurBus provides intercity bus service from Malvern to Park Avenue in the Manhattan section in New York City as part of a route running to New York City. The bus stop in Malvern is located at a park and ride lot on Matthews Road. The route started on December 21, 2017.

The Borough is also served by SEPTA's 92 Bus, which travels along King Street.

Notable people
Adam McKay, director, producer and entertainer.
 Mikal Bridges of the Brooklyn Nets, former two-time champion with Villanova Men's Basketball in 2016 and 2018, went to Great Valley High School.
 Phil Gosselin professional baseball player for the Philadelphia Phillies.
 Harry Hiestand, offensive line coach for Notre Dame and former Chicago Bears assistant coach, was born in Malvern.
 According to the book's preface, in 1899, Japanese polymath Nitobe Inazō wrote Bushido: The Soul of Japan while he was living in Malvern. This is the seminal work in English on the subject, still widely read today, and after translation into Japanese, the book was a key influence in the formulation of Japan's modern Bushido concept as applied in the Japanese Empire until its surrender to the Allied forces in 1945. Thus one seed of the Second Sino-Japanese War and The Pacific War was sown from Malvern—in the unwitting form of this gentle and elegant book.
 Drag racer Bill "Grumpy" Jenkins had a repair shop in Malvern.
 Frank Spellman (1922–2017), Olympic champion weightlifter, was born in Malvern.
 NASCAR crew chief Pat Tryson is from Malvern.

See also

References

External links

 Borough of Malvern

Populated places established in 1873
Boroughs in Chester County, Pennsylvania
1889 establishments in Pennsylvania